Victor Manuel Herrera Piggott (born 18 April 1980) is a Panamanian football midfielder.

Club career
Herrera played for several clubs in Panama as well as abroad. In July 2002 he joined Colombian side Millonarios but in October 2002, he was fired by the club for underperforming. He also had a spell in El Salvador with Luis Ángel Firpo and in Puerto Rican football with Puerto Rico Islanders and Sevilla PR.

International career
Herrera has been a member of all the youth processes of the Panama national team.

Nicknamed el Negro, he made his debut for Panama in a January 2000 friendly match against Guatemala and has earned a total of 32 caps, scoring 2 goals. He represented his country at the 2007 and 2009 CONCACAF Gold Cups.

His final international was a December 2010 friendly match against Honduras.

International goals
Scores and results list Panama's goal tally first.

Personal life
Herrera is a nephew of former Panama international player Percival Piggott. He was diagnosed with leukemia in February 2013.

Honors
Club
ANAPROF (2): 2000, 2006
Puerto Rico Soccer League (1): 2008
 
National team
UNCAF Nations Cup Runner-Up (1): 2007
UNCAF Nations Cup Champions (1): 2009

References

External links
Profile - PR Islanders
 
highlights

1980 births
Living people
Sportspeople from Panama City
Association football wingers
Panamanian footballers
Panama international footballers
2007 UNCAF Nations Cup players
2007 CONCACAF Gold Cup players
2009 UNCAF Nations Cup players
2009 CONCACAF Gold Cup players
Panamá Viejo players
Sporting San Miguelito players
Deportivo Toluca F.C. players
Club Necaxa footballers
C.D. Luis Ángel Firpo footballers
Millonarios F.C. players
San Francisco F.C. players
Puerto Rico Islanders players
Sevilla FC Puerto Rico players
Panamanian expatriate sportspeople in Mexico
Expatriate footballers in Mexico
Panamanian expatriate sportspeople in El Salvador
Expatriate footballers in El Salvador
Panamanian expatriate sportspeople in Colombia
Expatriate footballers in Colombia
Panamanian expatriate sportspeople in Puerto Rico
Expatriate footballers in Puerto Rico
USL First Division players
Copa Centroamericana-winning players